is a 1918 short story by Ryūnosuke Akutagawa, first published in the children's magazine Akai Tori.

Plot summary
Shakyamuni is meandering around Paradise one morning, when he stops at a lotus-filled pond. Between the lilies, he can see, through the crystal-clear waters, the depths of Hell. His eyes come to rest on one sinner in particular, by the name of Kandata. Kandata was a cold-hearted criminal, but had one good deed to his name: while walking through the forest one day, he decided not to kill a spider he was about to crush with his foot. Moved by this single act of compassion, the Buddha takes the silvery thread of a spider in Paradise and lowers it down into Hell.

Down in Hell, the myriad sinners are struggling in the Pool of Blood, in total darkness save for the light glinting off the Mountain of Spikes, and in total silence save for the sighs of the damned. Kandata, looking up by chance at the sky above the pool, sees the spider's thread descending towards him and grabs hold with all the might of a seasoned criminal. The climb from Hell to Paradise is not a short one, however, and Kandata quickly tires. Dangling from the middle of the rope, he glances downward, and sees how far he has come. Realizing that he may actually escape from Hell, he is overcome by joy and laughs giddily. His elation is short-lived, however, as he realizes that others have started climbing the thread behind him, stretching down into the murky depths below. Fearing that the thread will break from the weight of the others, he shouts that the spider's thread is his and his alone. It is at this moment that the thread breaks, and he and all the other sinners are cast back down into the Pool of Blood.

Shakyamuni witnesses this, knowing all, but still with a slightly sad air. In the end, Kandata condemned himself by being concerned only with his own salvation and not that of others. But Paradise continues on as it has, and it is nearly noontime there. Thus the Buddha continues his meanderings.

Sources of inspiration 
Akutagawa was known for piecing together many different sources for many of his stories, and "The Spider's Thread" is no exception.  He read Fyodor Dostoevsky's The Brothers Karamazov in English translation sometime between 1917 and 1918, and the story of "The Spider's Thread" is a retelling of a very short fable from the novel known as the Fable of the Onion, where an evil woman who had done no good at all in her life is sent to hell, but her guardian angel points out to God that she had in fact done one good deed in her life: she once gave an onion to a beggar. So God told the angel to take that onion and use it to pull her out of hell.  The angel very nearly managed to pull her out, but when other sinners began to hold on to her so they could also be pulled out, she kicked at them, saying that the onion was hers and she was the one getting pulled out, not them.  At that moment, the onion broke and the woman fell back into hell, where she remains.

Another inspiration for Akutagawa appears to be from a story of the same name found in Karma: A Story of Early Buddhism, an anthology of five Buddhist parables published in Tokyo in 1895.  He took from here the character of Kandata, who is also an evil robber reborn in a Buddhist hell until his bad karma expires.  Here, however, Kandata does not have a path to immediately leave hell but instead is told that any good deeds he may have done such as sparing the spider, would return to help him rise again.

See also
Cultural depictions of spiders

References

External links 
"Kumo no Ito" (with modern kanji forms and kana spellings) at Aozora Bunko 
 by Timothy M. Kelly

1918 short stories
Short stories by Ryūnosuke Akutagawa
Works originally published in Japanese magazines
Works originally published in children's magazines
Japanese children's literature
Buddhist novels
Japanese Buddhist texts
1918 novels
Japanese drama films
Spiders in popular culture